Hotta Tameike Dam is an earthfill dam located in Akita Prefecture in Japan. The dam is used for irrigation. The catchment area of the dam is 0.2 km2. The dam impounds about 7  ha of land when full and can store 672 thousand cubic meters of water. The construction of the dam was completed in 1956.

References

Dams in Akita Prefecture
1956 establishments in Japan